William H. Smith (June 11, 1842 – February 19, 1915) was Warden of the Borough of Norwalk, Connecticut from 1882 to 1885.

He was the son of William Duff Smith and Susan E. Smith of Norwalk.

He was for some time in partnership with William C. Street in the hardware business.

He was a member of the Norwalk City Council in 1896.

Associations 
 Founding incorporator (1887), The Norwalk Club

References 

1842 births
1915 deaths
Connecticut city council members
Mayors of Norwalk, Connecticut
Hardware merchants
19th-century American politicians